Simon Tatham (born 3 May 1977) is a British computer programmer. He created and maintains PuTTY, a free software implementation of Secure Shell (SSH) and Telnet for Microsoft Windows and Unix, along with an xterm terminal emulator.  He is also the original author of Netwide Assembler (NASM), and maintains a collection of small computer programs which implement one-player puzzle games. All of them run natively on Nintendo DS, Symbian S60, Unix (GTK; Android, MacOS), and Windows.

He attended University of Cambridge, and currently works at ARM Holdings.

See also 
 List of programmers
 List of computer scientists

References

External links 
 

1977 births
Living people
Alumni of the University of Cambridge
English engineers
British computer programmers
Free software programmers
Arm Holdings people